released in Europe as Athlete Kings due to a licensing issue, is a track-and-field themed arcade sports video game. On its unveiling, the gaming media generally described it as a modern clone of Daley Thompson's Decathlon. Released in 1996, it was developed and produced by Sega. A home port was released on the Sega Saturn in 1996, largely identical to the arcade version, due to the similar hardware of the ST-V hardware and the Saturn. It was released on the PlayStation 2 in Japan only as part of the Sega Ages 2500 series. Compared to other decathlon based games, Decathlete has a more comic and cartoon-like style. A sequel followed in 1997, which was the winter sports-based Winter Heat.

Gameplay

The overall gameplay is largely based on quick, repeated button pressing for gaining speed, and timed single button presses for jumping and releasing projectiles, in a similar style to the 1983 Konami arcade game, Track & Field. The game differs with a slightly more advanced control system and 3-D graphics.

The player must select one of eight fictional international athletes. In all versions, the player competes in ten traditional decathlon events: 100 metres, Long jump, Shot put, High jump, 400 metres, 110 metre hurdles, Discus throw, Pole vault, Javelin throw and 1500 metres. In the arcade version, the player is required to meet a minimum set time, height or distance to qualify for the next event. The home console versions allow the player to compete in a full decathlon featuring all ten events without qualifying limit. Despite a potential for a multiplayer gameplay, the game is limited to two players at a time. In a one-player game, the player competes against one AI-controlled opponent, chosen from the list of playable characters. The only exception to this is in the 1500 metres, where six generic athletes also participate in the race.

The PlayStation 2 port still allows only up to two human players to participate, but all playable characters appear in the sprint and dash events.

Characters
 Rick Blade: Also known as the "Pennsylvanian Power", the 25-year-old American athlete Blade is an all-rounder, making him a favourite in any event. He is roughly based on legendary athlete Carl Lewis.
 Karl Vein: A 28-year-old German competitor with long blonde hair who's known for his sheer confidence, to the point of arrogance. Although competitive in all events, he is said to be able to jump over anything.
 Robin Banks: A veteran at 38 years old, zebra print leotard-clad Banks is the reigning champion from the previous decathlon. The giant Briton is particularly strong in the throwing events. He is roughly similar in appearance to legendary athlete Daley Thompson. For the home releases of the game, his name was changed to Jef Jansens.  He was also removed altogether from the US release.
 Aleksei Rigel: A seasoned decathlon competitor, Rigel is physically the strongest of the eight competitors. This makes the 31-year-old Russian athlete good at throwing events.
 Joe Kudou: At 19, Japanese athlete Kudou is the youngest of the male competitors and thus lacks experience. He relies on his high skill levels in all event types. He wears a reversed baseball cap.
 Femi Kadiena: A national record breaker in her home nation, Kadiena has come to break records on the world stage. The 24-year-old Jamaican athlete specialises in jumping events.
 Ellen Reggiani: Due to her speed and stamina, Reggiani is known as the "French Express". The 20-year-old French competitor also works as a model. In others versions, her name was changed to Pilar Jimenez (as was her nationality to Spanish).
 Li Huang: The youngest competitor here at 15, Huang of China has silenced her critics, who object to her age, with her tremendous speed. She received a slight redesign in the US releases to make her appear less childish.
 Mankichi Kazami: A hidden character available only in the Japanese version of the game on the Sega Saturn. Appears to be based on a character from a Japanese Manga comic, "Decathlon". According to the synopsis of this comic, he is a 20-year-old "yokel" with significant natural athletic ability, but very little knowledge, who simply turns up for trials for the Olympics, having never competed before.

Development
DecAthlete was developed by Sega AM3. According to producer Mie Kumagai, AM3's general manager Hisao Oguchi came up with the idea to create a polygon-based sports game as the 1996 Summer Olympics in Atlanta approached. The team considered including swimming and gymnastics, but director Yoshitaka Maeyama insisted that the decathlon would suffice. The player's use of just one character to accumulate a point total was done to help differentiate the characters and to better resemble a  video game score.

DecAthlete was released on the PlayStation 2 in Japan as part of the DecAthlete Collection with Winter Heat and Virtua Athlete. The collection is the 15th volume of the Sega Ages 2500 series.

Reception

In Japan, Game Machine listed Decathlete on their July 1, 1996 issue as being the most-successful arcade game of the month. In the United States, it was one of the top ten highest-grossing arcade games of 1996. The console port was among the nineteen best-selling Saturn games of 1996 in the United Kingdom, according to HMV.

A reviewer for Next Generation said that compared to its rival, Konami's International Track & Field, DecAthlete has far more polygons, producing characters which are "completely smooth, crisp, and full of life." He also praised the variety of events, strong selection of modes and features, heavy distinction between the playable characters, and emphasis on timing and skill over button-mashing, which he felt set it apart from previous track-and-field games. His one criticism is that it supports up to two players, compared to International Track and Fields four players. The two sports reviewers of Electronic Gaming Monthly both commented that the game rose above simple button-mashing and had a strong sense of realism. Rob Allsetter of Sega Saturn Magazine highlighted the 60 frames per second animation, and agreed with Next Generation and EGM that, while DecAthlete does involve some button-mashing, it emphasizes skill conspicuously more than other games in the genre. He also agreed that the game's one shortcoming is that it does not support more than two players.

In 1997, Electronic Gaming Monthly listed the Saturn version as number 95 on their "100 Best Games of All Time", calling it "the ultimate sports game for people who aren't into sports games." They cited its excellent graphics, control, and camera angles, and the humorous characters.

Notes

References

External links
 https://web.archive.org/web/20110223133518/http://uk.gamespot.com/saturn/action/decathlete/index.html at GameSpot
 https://web.archive.org/web/20110223151107/http://uk.cheats.ign.com/objects/000/000375.html at IGN

1996 video games
Arcade video games
PlayStation 2 games
Sega arcade games
Sega video games
Sega Saturn games
Olympic video games
Athletics video games
Video games developed in Japan